Mark Stone may refer to:
 Mark Kennedy (police officer) (born 1969), former Metropolitan Police officer in the UK, known undercover as Mark Stone
 Mark Stone (baritone) (born 1969), British baritone
 Mark Stone (ice hockey) (born 1992), Canadian ice hockey player
 Mark Stone (journalist) (born 1979), US correspondent of Sky News, 2021-
 Mark Stone (politician) (born 1957), California politician
 Mark Stone (EastEnders), fictional character
 Mark Stone: MIA Hunter, a series of men's adventure novels
 Mark Stone, original bassist of rock band Van Halen